Eana argentana is a moth of the  family Tortricidae. It is found in Great Britain, Spain, France, Luxembourg, Belgium, the Netherlands, Germany, Austria, Switzerland, Italy, the Czech Republic, Slovakia, Poland, Albania, Bosnia and Herzegovina, Slovenia, Hungary, Bulgaria, Romania, North Macedonia, Greece, Norway, Sweden, Finland, the Baltic region and Russia. It is also present in western North America, where it has been recorded from Alaska, Alberta, Arizona, British Columbia, California, Maine, Montana, New Mexico, Washington and Wyoming. The habitat consists of high-elevation open habitats.

The wingspan is 20–26 mm. Adults have uniform whitish forewings. The hindwings are light grey. Adults are on wing from July to August.

The larvae feed on Gramineae species. They feed on the roots of their host plant from within a silken tube. Larvae can be found from May to June. The species overwinters as a first instar larva in a silken shelter.

References

Moths described in 1759
Cnephasiini
Taxa named by Carl Alexander Clerck